Sheikh Mand or Sheikh Mend was a 13th-century Yazidi saint. He is the son of Şêx Fexredîn and thus belongs to the Şemsanî lineage of sheikhs. His sister was Khatuna Fekhra, revered today as one of the most important Yazidi female saints.

Association with snakes
Sheikh Mand is traditionally considered to be a patron of snakes. His shrine at Lalish is said to contain a cave that is full of snakes.

References

13th-century births
13th-century deaths
Yazidi mythology
Yazidi history
Yazidi religion
13th-century Kurdish people
Yazidi holy figures